Sébastien Grosjean and Michaël Llodra were the defending champions, but were eliminated in the round robin competition.

Àlex Corretja and Juan Carlos Ferrero won the title, defeating Yevgeny Kafelnikov and Marat Safin in the final, 6–3, 6–3.

Draw

Final

Group A
Standings are determined by: 1. number of wins; 2. number of matches; 3. in three-players-ties, percentage of sets won, or of games won; 4. steering-committee decision.

Group B
Standings are determined by: 1. number of wins; 2. number of matches; 3. in three-players-ties, percentage of sets won, or of games won; 4. steering-committee decision.

References

Legends Under 45 Doubles